Baljit Sahni (born 12 January 1987) is an Indian former professional footballer who played as a forward.

Career

JCT
Sahni had played for JCT for 5 years. In the 2009–10 season he scored the first hat trick of the season against Shillong Lajong. On 11 November 2009 however Sahni was seriously injured in a bike accident along with teammate Sunil Kumar Thakur in Margao, Goa while the team were preparing for an upcoming match against Salgaocar in the I-League. As a result of the accident Sahni required 25 stitches and he fractured his shin. At this point in the season Sahni was in top form with six goals in the opening seven matches. However, on 28 January 2010 Sahni played in his first game since the accident, coming on as a second-half substitute and he even scored a goal as JCT Mills defeated Sporting Goa 2–0.

East Bengal
In 2010 Sahni signed with I-League giants East Bengal.

Retirement and financial struggle
Sahni faced monetary issues while playing, so he decided to retire early at the age of 31. Sahni said, "In 2019 I left for Canada. I was not getting paid enough. I had to earn my bread and butter and I also have a family to take care of. I retired from football because after football there is a life too and that is hard but you have to accept that life and take it on the chin."

Career statistics

Honours
Atlético de Kolkata
Indian Super League: 2014

References

External links
 
 

Indian footballers
1987 births
Living people
I-League players
Footballers from Hoshiarpur
Footballers from Punjab, India
India international footballers
JCT FC players
East Bengal Club players
Indian Super League players
ATK (football club) players
Association football forwards